Delta Constituency was a constituency in Singapore. It used to exist from 1959 to 1988. It was originally part of Havelock Constituency.

Elections

References
1984 Parliamentary General Election result
1980 Parliamentary General Election result
1976 Parliamentary General Election result
1972 Parliamentary General Election result
1968 Parliamentary General Election result
1963 Legislative Assembly General Election result
1959 Legislative Assembly General Election result

Singaporean electoral divisions